Kremen protein 1 is a protein that in humans is encoded by the KREMEN1 gene. Kremen1 is conserved in chordates including amphioxus and most vertebrate species. The protein is a type I transmembrane receptor of ligands Dickkopf1, Dickkopf2, Dickkopf3, Dickkopf4, EpCAM and Rspondin1.

== Function ==
This gene encodes a high-affinity dickkopf homolog 1 (DKK1) transmembrane receptor that functionally cooperates with DKK1 to block wingless (WNT)/beta-catenin signaling. The encoded protein is a component of a membrane complex that modulates canonical WNT signaling through lipoprotein receptor-related protein 6 (LRP6). It contains extracellular Kringle, WSC, and CUB domains. Alternatively spliced transcript variants encoding distinct isoforms have been observed for this gene.

Kremen1 also has a function in the induction of cell death by apoptosis. This proapototic activity is conditional and depends on the absence of ligand Dickkopf1. These observations led to the classification of this protein as a Dependence Receptor.

A mouse knock out of Kremen1 and its paralog Kremen2 is viable and fertile.

References

Further reading